Valdemar Nielsen (21 June 1879 – 3 June 1954) was a Danish cyclist. He competed in two events at the 1912 Summer Olympics. In 1911 he won the Danish 345 km long-distance classic Sjælland Rundt.

References

External links
 

1879 births
1954 deaths
Danish male cyclists
Olympic cyclists of Denmark
Cyclists at the 1912 Summer Olympics
Cyclists from Copenhagen